Jagudis de Biombo is a Guinea-Bissauan football club based in Biombo. They play in the 2 division in Guinean football, the Campeonato Nacional da Guine-Bissau.

Jagudis de Biombo